Ilias Gianniotis (born 5 April 1997) is a Greek professional footballer who plays as a winger for Ialysos.

Club career

Panetolikos
Gianniotis joined the youth club of Panetolikos in 2014.  He signed his first professional contract in July 2016.

He made his Superleague debut on 18 March 2017 coming on in the 58th minute in a match against AEL.

Career statistics

Club

References

External links
SuperLeague Profile

1997 births
Living people
Greek footballers
Super League Greece players
Panetolikos F.C. players
Association football wingers